Ubiquitin-conjugating enzyme E2 B is a protein that in humans is encoded by the UBE2B gene.

The modification of proteins with ubiquitin is an important cellular mechanism for targeting abnormal or short-lived proteins for degradation. Ubiquitination involves at least three classes of enzymes: ubiquitin-activating enzymes, or E1s, ubiquitin-conjugating enzymes, or E2s, and ubiquitin-protein ligases, or E3s. This gene encodes a member of the E2 ubiquitin-conjugating enzyme family. This enzyme is required for post-replicative DNA damage repair. Its protein sequence is 100% identical to the mouse, rat, and rabbit homologs, which indicates that this enzyme is highly conserved in eukaryotic evolution.

Interactions
UBE2B has been shown to interact with RAD18.

References

Further reading